Orthaga amphimelas is a species of snout moth in the genus Orthaga. It is known from Australia.

References

Moths described in 1913
Epipaschiinae
Endemic fauna of Australia